The New Cumberland Defense Depot is a United States Department of Defense military base located a short distance south of Harrisburg, Pennsylvania, in Fairview Township, York County, Pennsylvania. It is adjacent to the Capital City Airport and a short distance east of the Harrisburg West Shore interchange of the Pennsylvania Turnpike (Interstate 76, which forms the southern boundary of the base) with Interstate 83 and to the north Interstate 81. The Susquehanna River forms the base's eastern boundary.

It employs about 3,000 civilian and 100 military personnel. The Quartermaster Department had built the depot at New Cumberland in 1918, originally naming it the Marsh Run Storage Depot.

References

External links

Military facilities in Pennsylvania
Historic American Engineering Record in Pennsylvania